William Robert Ogilvie-Grant (25 March 1863 – 26 July 1924) was a Scottish ornithologist.

Early life and education

Grant born on 25 March 1863 as second son of Capt. Hon. George Henry Essex Ogilvie-Grant, of Easter Elchies, Craigellachie, Scotland, of the 42nd Highlanders, sixth son of Francis Ogilvy-Grant, 6th Earl of Seafield, and daughter of Sir William Gordon-Cumming, 2nd Baronet. Ogilvie-Grant was educated at Fettes College, Edinburgh, where he studied zoology and anatomy. He also studied at Cargilfield Preparatory School.

Career
In 1882 he became an Assistant at the Natural History Museum. He studied ichthyology under Albert C. L. G. Günther, and in 1885 he was put in temporary charge of the Ornithological Section under Richard Bowdler Sharpe's visit to India. He remained in that department, eventually becoming Curator of Birds from 1909 to 1918.

He also succeeded Bowdler Sharpe as editor of the Bulletin of the British Ornithologists' Club, a post he held from 1904 to 1914.

Ogilvie-Grant made many collecting trips, especially to Socotra and the Madeira and Canary islands.

Taxon described by him
See :Category:Taxa named by William Robert Ogilvie-Grant

Taxon named in his honor 
Ogilvie-Grant is commemorated in the scientific name of a species of gecko, Hemidactylus granti, which is endemic to Socotra.

The Banso double-spurred francolin bird Pternistis bicalcaratus ogilviegranti (Bannerman 1922) is named after him.

Personal life
Ogilvie-Grant married Maud Louisa, daughter of Admiral Mark Robert Pechell; they had a son and three daughters. His son Mark Ogilvie-Grant was a diplomat and botanist.

References

Source
Mullens and Swann - A Bibliography of British Ornithology.

1863 births
1924 deaths
Scottish ornithologists
Employees of the Natural History Museum, London
Scottish lepidopterists
People educated at Cargilfield School
People educated at Fettes College